Keith Arlen Magnuson (April 27, 1947 – December 15, 2003) was a Canadian professional ice hockey defenceman from Wadena, Saskatchewan who played in the National Hockey League (NHL) between 1969 and 1979.

Magnuson played 589 career NHL games, all with the Chicago Black Hawks, wearing # 3, and scoring 14 goals and 125 assists for 139 points. Although he didn't score many goals, he was a part of a solid defensive team with the Blackhawks.  Perhaps his most telling statistic is his 1,442 career penalty minutes, which included many fighting majors. For a few seasons, Magnuson was captain of the Chicago Blackhawks team. In April 1970, he appeared on the cover of Sports Illustrated. In 1971 and 1972, Magnuson played in the National Hockey League All-Star Game. He never played for a Stanley Cup winner, losing in the finals twice in 1971 and 1973 both to the Montreal Canadiens. Prior to his NHL career, Magnuson was a two time All-American at the University of Denver, who led his team to two consecutive NCAA titles in 1968 and 1969.

Magnuson was the great uncle to Major League Baseball pitcher Trystan Magnuson and uncle to former Canadian Football League player, Quinn Magnuson. His son Kevin was a member of the 1998 NCAA Ice Hockey Championship team at the University of Michigan and is now a NHLPA registered player agent and lawyer.

Magnuson was killed in an auto accident in Vaughan, Ontario. Fellow NHL alumnus Rob Ramage was behind the wheel (Ramage survived the accident and later found guilty of impaired driving causing death).

Life
Magnuson grew up in Wadena, Saskatchewan. His family moved to Saskatoon when he was 10 years old. When he was seventeen he played for the Saskatoon Blades, before he received a hockey scholarship to the University of Denver. He joined the Chicago Black Hawks for the 1969–70 season and led the league in penalty minutes in his first two seasons. He became an assistant coach for the Black Hawks after he retired in 1979 and was promoted to head coach for the 1980-81 season.

Death
On December 15, 2003, Rob Ramage was driving Magnuson to an NHLPA players' alumni meeting when his rented Chrysler Intrepid swerved into the oncoming lane and collided with another vehicle, killing Magnuson and injuring the driver of the other vehicle. Ramage was charged with impaired driving causing death and dangerous driving causing death. Defence lawyer Brian Greenspan claimed the blood and urine tests were flawed, and the smell of alcohol came from beer cans that exploded after the crash.

On November 12, 2008, the Chicago Blackhawks retired Magnuson's number 3, along with that of Hall of Fame defenceman Pierre Pilote, before a game against the Boston Bruins.

Awards and honours
Played in 1971 and 1972 NHL All-Star Game

Career statistics

Coaching record

References

External links

 

1947 births
2003 deaths
Accidental deaths in Ontario
AHCA Division I men's ice hockey All-Americans
Alcohol-related deaths in Canada
Canadian expatriate ice hockey players in the United States
Canadian ice hockey coaches
Canadian ice hockey defencemen
Chicago Blackhawks announcers
Chicago Blackhawks captains
Chicago Blackhawks coaches
Chicago Blackhawks players
Denver Pioneers men's ice hockey players
Ice hockey people from Saskatchewan
National Hockey League All-Stars
National Hockey League players with retired numbers
NCAA men's ice hockey national champions
Road incident deaths in Canada
Saskatoon Blades players
University of Denver alumni